François-Léo Séguin called Alfred Séguin (22 November 1825, Baignes-Sainte-Radegonde – circa 1900) was a 19th-century French novelist and playwright.

Works 
1860: À bon chat, bon rat !, vaudeville-opéretta in 1 act
1862: Rondes et rondeaux chantés... dans les Folies de Montmartre, Dubois and E. Vert
1865: Le Jour de l'an, one-act comédie en vaudevilles
1865 Paul et Virginie dans une mansarde, one-act comédie en vaudevilles, with Jean Pierre Charles Perrot de Renneville
1867: Les Hommes en grève, new vaudeville in 4 acts, with Édouard Hermil
1871:  Paris ne mourra pas !, P.-M. Cadoret
1875: Bengali, ou les Fils du paria followed by À vol d'oiseau, Didier
1876: La Petite Franchette, ou Tout est bien qui finit bien, one-act comédie en vaudevilles
1877: Le Robinson noir, P. Ducrocq
1877: Le Talisman de Marguerite, Didier
1877: Théâtre de jeunes gens, T. Olmer
1879: Le Courrier persan, J. Bonhoure
1879: Les Finesses de Pierrette, one-act comedy
1887: Si j'étais grand !, A. Picard et Kaan
1891: Les Infortunes de Simonne, A. Picard et Kaan
1894: Les Petits coureurs des bois, A. Picard et Kaan
1897: Lise, Lisette et Lison, A. Picard et Kaan
1897: Les Promesses de Mlle Augustine, A. Picard et Kaan

External links 
 Alfred Seguin on Data.bnf.fr
 Le Robinson noir on Gallica

People from Charente
19th-century French dramatists and playwrights
19th-century French novelists
1825 births
1900s deaths